The topological entanglement entropy or topological entropy, usually denoted by , is a number characterizing many-body states that possess topological order.

A non-zero topological entanglement entropy reflects the presence of long range quantum entanglements in a many-body quantum state. So the  topological entanglement entropy links topological order with pattern of long range quantum entanglements.

Given a topologically ordered state, the topological entropy can be extracted from the asymptotic behavior of the Von Neumann entropy measuring the quantum entanglement between a spatial block and the rest of the system.  The entanglement entropy of a simply connected region of boundary length L, within an infinite two-dimensional topologically ordered state, has the following form for large L:

where  is the topological entanglement entropy.

The topological entanglement entropy is equal to the logarithm of the total quantum dimension of the quasiparticle excitations of the state.  

For example, the simplest fractional quantum Hall states, the Laughlin states at filling fraction 1/m, have γ = ½log(m).  The Z2 fractionalized states, such as topologically ordered states of 
Z2 spin-liquid, quantum dimer models on non-bipartite lattices, and Kitaev's toric code state, are characterized γ = log(2).

See also

Quantum topology
Topological defect
Topological order
Topological quantum field theory
Topological quantum number
Topological string theory

References

Calculations for specific topologically ordered states

 
 

Condensed matter physics
Statistical mechanics
Entropy